No. 264 Squadron RAF, also known as No. 264 (Madras Presidency) Squadron, was a squadron of the Royal Air Force.

World War I  
The squadron was first formed during the First World War, from two former Royal Naval Air Service flights, No. 439 and No. 440, on 27 September 1918 at Souda Bay, Crete.

It performed anti-submarine patrols with the Short 184 floatplanes, over the Aegean. 264 Squadron was disbanded, following the end of the war, on 1 March 1919.

World War II

On 8 December 1939 it was re-formed at RAF Station Martlesham Heath to bring the Boulton Paul Defiant fighter into service.  Operations began in March 1940 when the squadron started convoy patrols. After initial successes, the Luftwaffe soon realised that the Defiant was vulnerable to frontal attack, and the squadron started to have heavy losses of aircraft and crew.  At the end of May 1940 the squadron was withdrawn from day fighting operations and began to train in the night fighter role.  It was called into action again in day fighting at the height of the Battle of Britain, but again suffered losses and returned to night fighting.  After a number of moves around England, including Luton Airport, in May 1942 the squadron moved to RAF Colerne to operate the de Havilland Mosquito II, later trading them in for the later Mark VI. The Mosquitos were operated as night fighters in the west of England, and on day patrols in the Bay of Biscay and western approaches.

In 1943, after concentrating on night intruder missions, the squadron operated in support of the Bomber Command, defending bomber formations against enemy night-fighters. In 1944 it re-equipped with the newer Mosquito XIII and returned to defensive roles. In June it carried out patrols over the Normandy beaches, until returning to night patrols from western England in the western approaches.  As the Allied forces advanced, the squadron became part of the 2nd Tactical Air Force providing night patrols.  By the end of the war it was carrying out patrols over Berlin from its airfield at Twente in the Netherlands.  It was disbanded at Twente on 25 August 1945.

Postwar operations

The squadron was re-formed again on 20 November 1945 at RAF Church Fenton when 125 Squadron was renumbered.  It operated the de Havilland Mosquito NF30 and NF36 in the night fighter role as part of the peacetime Fighter Command.  By 1951 the squadron was posted to RAF Linton-on-Ouse, where that November its Mosquitos were replaced by the Gloster Meteor NF11, and in October 1954 by the Gloster Meteor NF14. From February 1957 the squadron was based at RAF Middleton St George until 30 September 1957, when it was disbanded after being re-numbered 33 Squadron at RAF Leeming.

The squadron was in existence again between 1958 and 1962 at RAF North Coates as the first squadron to operate the Bristol Bloodhound I ground-to-air missile.

Aircraft operated

 1918–1919 Short 184
 1939–1941 Boulton Paul Defiant I
 1941–1942 Boulton Paul Defiant II
 1942–1944 de Havilland Mosquito II
 1943–1943 de Havilland Mosquito VI
 1943–1945 de Havilland Mosquito XIII
 1945–1946 de Havilland Mosquito NF30
 1946–1952 de Havilland Mosquito NF36
 1951–1954 Gloster Meteor NF11
 1954–1957 Gloster Meteor NF14
 1958–1962 Bristol Bloodhound I

See also
List of Royal Air Force aircraft squadrons

References

Notes

Bibliography

 Delve, Ken. The Source Book of the RAF. Shrewsbury, UK: Airlife Publishing, UK, 1994. .
 Halley, James J. The Squadrons of the Royal Air Force & Commonwealth, 1918–1988. Tonbridge, Kent, UK: Air-Britain (historians) Ltd., 1988. .
 Rawlings, John D. R. Fighter Squadrons of the RAF and their Aircraft. London: Macdonald and Jane's .1976. .
 The Illustrated Encyclopedia of Aircraft (Part Work 1982–1985), Orbis Publishing, UK. OCLC 669683964

External links

Military units and formations established in 1918
264
1918 establishments in the United Kingdom